Yuddham Sharanam is a 2017 Indian Telugu-language action thriller film produced by Sai Korrapati on Varahi Chalana Chitram banner and directed by debutant Krishna Marimuthu. The movie stars Naga Chaitanya and Lavanya Tripathi. Srikanth plays the main antagonist, while Rao Ramesh, Revathi, and Murali Sharma play supporting roles. Vivek Sagar composed the music for this movie. The movie was launched in February 2017. The film marks the 10th film from the production house. It is released theatrically on 8 September 2017.

Plot
Arjun is a dreamer who is experimenting with his own brand of drone. His parents Murali Krishna and Seetha Lakshmi are Good Samaritans, tending to the ill and resurrecting lives. His mother is a doctor, and his father is a pillar of strength in his life. Arjun lives with his parents and sisters. He falls in love with a medical intern named Anjali.

Somewhere, a politician who has just committed a Rs. 3000 crore scam wants to divert the attention of the people by engineering serials blasts. Nayak, a gangster with a mafia-type network, is fielded by the politician's men to mastermind the blasts. On the day of the blasts, Arjun's parents go missing. Arjun searches for them, and realizes that there was more than what meets the eye in their lives. Meanwhile, Jaidev "JD" Shastri is determined to solve the blasts case.

Arjun finds his parents' bodies in a river. The police closes it as a car accident, but in the postmortem report, it is revealed that there is industrial water in their stomachs. Arjun complains about it to the police, and Nayak learns this. He sends his goons to kill Arjun and his family. Arjun protects his family from the goons and sends them to a faraway place. He learns that Nayak killed his parents as they were the prime witnesses to the bomb blasts. Arjun starts to fight back. A cat-and-mouse game ensures, and Arjun kills kills Nayak and his gang, too. The film ends with him starting a peaceful life with his lady love and family.

Cast

 Naga Chaitanya as Arjun 
 Lavanya Tripathi as Anjali
 Srikanth as Nayak
 Rao Ramesh as Murali Krishna
 Revathi as Seetha Lakshmi
 Murali Sharma as Jaidev "JD" Shastri
 Priyadarshi Pullikonda as Alex
 Ravi Varma as Tharun
 Seema Chowdary as Dhanu
 Harika Vedula as Radhika
 Vinod Kumar as Politician
 Raja Ravindra as Murthy
 Kireeti Damaraju as Sekar
 Pawan as Jogi
 Shafi as Selvam
 Madhusudhan Rao as Venkat Rao
 Charandeep as DK
 Rathna Shekar Reddy
 John Kottoly as Ranjith
 Appaji Ambarisha Darbha as IAS Officer

Music 
The soundtrack for the film is composed by Vivek Sagar. The first track "Enno Enno Bhaavaley" was released on 7 August 2017, to celebrate the Indian festival of Raksha Bandhan. The full audio jukebox was released along with the trailer on 27 August 2017.

Release 
The film was released on 8 September 2017.

Reception

Box office 
Yuddham Sharanam, on the opening day it collected a total gross of 4 Crores worldwide.
On the second day movie collected a total gross of 2 Crores worldwide, and making its two-day collection 6 Crores.

Critical reception 
The Times of India gave 3 out of 5 stars stating "Suffices to say that Yuddham Sharanam and Marimuthu impress with the emotional part but falter with the action drama. All said and done, this one might go down as Naga Chaitanya’s best action-film to date".Firstpost gave 2.75 out of 5 stars stating "At a runtime of 140 minutes, Yuddham Sharanam tries to weave a convincing tale of revenge and love. There’s a lot to like about it, but then, at the same time, the film doesn’t let you immerse yourself in its world. And this distance just keeps growing as we flip through its pages".
Behindwoods gave 2.75 out of 5 stars stating "A well-made film that’s high on emotion and action". IndiaGlitz gave 2.25 out of 5 stars stating "A film whose plot never seems to thicken, a climax which disappears without a whimper, simplistic scenes, lack of twists.  Without 'sharanam'".

References

External links
 

2017 films
Indian action thriller films
Indian films about revenge
2010s Telugu-language films
2017 action thriller films
Vaaraahi Chalana Chitram films